Downton is a surname. Notable people with the surname include:

Andrew Downton (born 1977), Australian cricketer
David Downton (born 1959), British fashion illustrator
George Downton (1928–2014), English cricketer
James V. Downton (born 1938), American sociologist
John Downton (1906–1991), English artist
Paul Downton (born 1957), English cricketer
Paul F Downton, architect